North American English regional phonology is the study of variations in the pronunciation of spoken North American English (English of the United States and Canada)—what are commonly known simply as "regional accents". Though studies of regional dialects can be based on multiple characteristics, often including characteristics that are phonemic (sound-based, focusing on major word-differentiating patterns and structures in speech), phonetic (sound-based, focusing on any more exact and specific details of speech), lexical (vocabulary-based), and syntactic (grammar-based), this article focuses only on the former two items. North American English includes American English, which has several highly developed and distinct regional varieties, along with the closely related Canadian English, which is more homogeneous geographically. American English (especially Western dialects) and Canadian English have more in common with each other than with varieties of English outside North America.

The most recent work documenting and studying the phonology of North American English dialects as a whole is the 2006 Atlas of North American English (ANAE) by William Labov, Sharon Ash, and Charles Boberg, on which much of the description below is based, following on a tradition of sociolinguistics dating to the 1960s; earlier large-scale American dialectology focused more on lexicology than on phonology.

Overview
Regional dialects in North America are historically the most strongly differentiated along the Eastern seaboard, due to distinctive speech patterns of urban centers of the American East Coast like Boston, New York City, and certain Southern cities, all of these accents historically noted by their London-like r-dropping (called non-rhoticity), a feature gradually receding among younger generations, especially in the South. The Connecticut River is now regarded as the southern and western boundary of the traditional New England accents, today still centered on Boston and much of Eastern New England. The Potomac River generally divides a group of Northeastern coastal dialects from an area of older Southeastern coastal dialects. All older Southern dialects, however, have mostly now receded in favor of a strongly rhotic, more unified accent group spread throughout the entire Southern United States since the late 1800s and into the early 1900s. In-between the two aforementioned rivers, some other variations exist, most famous among them being New York City English.

Outside of the Eastern seaboard, all other North American English (both in the U.S. and Canada) has been firmly rhotic (pronouncing all r sounds), since the very first arrival of English-speaking settlers. Rhoticity is a feature shared today with the English of Ireland, for example, rather than most of the English of England, which has become non-rhotic since the late 1700s. The sound of Western U.S. English, overall, is much more homogeneous than Eastern U.S. English. The interior and western half of the country was settled by people who were no longer closely connected to England, living farther from the British-influenced Atlantic Coast.

Certain particular vowel sounds are the best defining characteristics of regional North American English including any given speaker's presence, absence, or transitional state of the so-called cot–caught merger. Northeastern New England, Canadian, and Western Pennsylvania accents, as well as all accents of the Western U.S. have a merger of these  and  vowels, so that pairs of words like mock and talk, rod and clawed, or slot and bought rhyme. On the contrary, Baltimore, Philadelphia and New York metropolitan accents, plus inland accents of the Northern and Southern U.S., all strongly resist this merger, keeping the two sounds separate and thus maintaining an extra distinct vowel sound. The rest of the U.S. largely shows a transitional state of the merger, particularly the Midland dialect region, from Ohio to eastern Kansas.

This fronting characterizes Midland, Mid-Atlantic, and Southern U.S. accents; these accents also front and raise the  vowel (of words like house, now, and loud), making yowl sound something like yeah-wool or even yale. Northern U.S. English, however, tends to keep all these vowels more backed. Southern and some Midland U.S. accents are often most quickly recognized by the weakening or deleting of the "glide" sound of the  vowel in words like thyme, mile, and fine, making the word spy sound something like spa.

One phenomenon apparently unique to North American U.S. accents is the irregular behavior of words that in the British English standard, Received Pronunciation, have  (where V stands for any vowel). Words of this class include, among others: origin, Florida, horrible, quarrel, warren, borrow, tomorrow, sorry, and sorrow. In General American there is a split: the majority of these words have  (the sound of the word or), but the last four words of the list above have  (the sound of the words are). In the accents of Greater New York City, Philadelphia, the Carolinas and older Southern, most or all of these words are pronounced  (Shitara 1993).

Classification of regional accents

Hierarchy of regional accents 
The findings and categorizations of the 2006 The Atlas of North American English (or ANAE), use one well-supported way to hierarchically classify North American English accents at the level of broad geographic regions, sub-regions, etc. The North American regional accent represented by each branch, in addition to each of its own features, also contains all the features of the branch it extends from.

 NORTH AMERICA
CANADA and WESTERN UNITED STATES = conservative  +  is fronted + cot–caught merger
Atlantic Canada =  is fronted before  + full Canadian raising 
Standard Canada and Northwest = conservative  before  +  is tensed before  + Canadian Shift ( ←  ←  ← )
 Inland Canada = full Canadian raising
GREATER NEW YORK CITY = fronted  + conservative  and  + cot–caught distinction + New York  split system + Mary–marry–merry 3-way distinction
New York City = R-dropping
NEW ENGLAND and NORTH-CENTRAL UNITED STATES = conservative  + conservative  + conservative  + pin–pen distinction
North = cot–caught distinction +  is fronted before 
Inland North =  is often tensed, encouraging the Northern Cities Shift ( ←  ←  ←  ←  ← )
Eastern New England =  R-dropping + full Canadian raising + lack of the weak vowel merger
Northeastern New England = cot–caught merger + father–bother distinction +  is fronted before 
Rhode Island = cot–caught distinction + conservative  before 
Upper Midwest = cot–caught merger +  is central before  +  is tensed before 
Wisconsin and Minnesota = haggle–Hegel merger
SOUTHEASTERN UNITED STATES =  is fronted +  is fronted +  is fronted
Southeastern Super-Region =  cot–caught distinction or near-merger +  is fronted
Mid-Atlantic = Mid-Atlantic  split system + Mary–marry–merry 3-way distinction
Midland =  can be monophthongized before resonants + variable pin–pen merger
South =  is monophthongized, encouraging the Southern Shift ( ←  ←  ←  and drawling) + pin–pen merger + lack of the weak vowel merger
Inland South = Back Upglide Chain Shift ( ←  ←  ← ) + fill–feel merger
 Marginal Southeast = cot–caught merger
Western Pennsylvania = cot–caught merger, encouraging the Pittsburgh Chain Shift ( ←  ← ) + full–fool merger

Maps of regional accents 

 Western
 The Western dialect, including Californian and New Mexican sub-types (with Pacific Northwest English also, arguably, a sub-type), is defined by:
 Cot–caught merger to 
  is 
  is 
 North Central
 The North Central ("Upper Midwest") dialect, including an Upper Michigan sub-type, is defined by:
 Cot–caught merger to 
  is 
 Inland Northern
 The Inland Northern ("Great Lakes") dialect is defined by:
  is universally , the triggering event for the Northern Cities Vowel Shift in more advanced sub-types ( ←  ←  ←  ←  ← )
  is 
 Midland
 The Midland dialect is defined by:
 Cot–caught merger is in transition
  is 
  is 
 WPA
 The Western Pennsylvania dialect, including its advanced Pittsburgh sub-type, is defined by:
  is 
 Full–fool–foal merger to 
 Southern
 The Southern dialects, including several sub-types, are defined by:
Variable rhoticity (parts of Louisiana are still non-rhotic, even among younger people )
 "Southern drawl" may break short front vowels into gliding vowels:  → ;  → ;  → 
  is 
 Mid-Atlantic
 The Mid-Atlantic ("Delaware Valley") dialect, including Philadelphia and Baltimore sub-types, is defined by:
  is 
  is 
 No Mary–marry–merry merger
 NYC
 The New York City dialect (with New Orleans English an intermediate sub-type between NYC and Southern) is defined by:
 Non-rhoticity or variable rhoticity
  is 
 No Mary–marry–merry merger
 father–bother not necessarily merged
 ENE
 Eastern New England dialect, including Maine and Boston sub-types (with Rhode Island English an intermediate sub-type between ENE and NYC), is defined by:
 Non-rhoticity or variable rhoticity
  is 
  is 
  is 
 Possibly no Mary–marry–merry merger

All regional Canadian English dialects, unless specifically stated otherwise, are rhotic, with the father–bother merger, cot–caught merger, and pre-nasal "short a" tensing. The broadest regional dialects include:
 Standard Canadian
 The Standard Canadian dialect, including its most advanced Inland Canadian sub-type and others, is defined by:
  is 
 Atlantic Canadian
  is 
  is

Chart of regional accents

Alternative classifications
Combining information from the phonetic research through interviews of Labov et al. in the ANAE (2006) and the phonological research through surveys of Vaux (2004), Hedges (2017) performed a latent class analysis (cluster analysis) to generate six clusters, each with American English features that naturally occurred together and each expected to match up with one of these six broad U.S. accent regions: the North, the South, the West, New England, the Midland, and the Mid-Atlantic (including New York City). The results showed that the accent regions/clusters were largely consistent with those outlined in the ANAE.

The parenthetical words indicate that the likelihood of their pronunciation occurs overwhelmingly in a particular region (well over 50% likelihood) but does not meet the >86% threshold set by Hedges (2017) for what necessarily defines one of the six regional accents. Blank boxes in the chart indicate regions where neither pronunciation variant particularly dominates over the other; in some of these instances, the data simply may be inconclusive or unclear.

★ Hedges (2017) acknowledges that the two pronunciations marked by this star are discrepancies of her latent class analysis, since they conflict with Vaux (2004)'s surveys.

General American 

General American is an umbrella accent of American English perceived by many Americans to be "neutral" and free of regional characteristics. A General American accent is not a specific well-defined standard English in the way that Received Pronunciation (RP) has historically been the standard prestigious variant of the English language in England; rather, accents with a variety of features can all be perceived by Americans as "General American" so long as they lack certain sociolinguistically salient features: namely, that is, lacking regional features (such as R-dropping, which usually identifies an American speaker as being from the East Coast or South), ethnic features (such as the "clear L" sound, which often identifies speakers as being Hispanic), or socioeconomic features (such as th-stopping, which often identifies speakers of a lower-class background).

Canada and Western United States 

The English dialect region encompassing the Western United States and Canada is the largest one in North America and also the one with the fewest distinctive phonological features. This can be attributed to the fact that the West is the region most recently settled by English speakers, and so there has not been sufficient time for the region either to develop highly distinctive innovations or to split into strongly distinct dialectological subregions. The main phonological features of the Western U.S. and Canada are a completed cot-caught merger, a backed  vowel (like the Northern U.S.), and a fronted  vowel (like the Southern U.S.).

Atlantic Canada

The accents of Atlantic Canada are more marked than the accents of the whole rest of English-speaking Canada. English of this region broadly includes  fronting before  and full Canadian raising, but no Canadian Shift (the vowel shift documented in Standard Canadian English).

Canada and Pacific Northwest

All of Canada, except the Atlantic Provinces and French-speaking Québec, speaks Standard Canadian English: the relatively uniform variety of North American English native to inland and western Canada, linguistically related to the Pacific Northwest, a region extending from British Columbia south into the Northwestern United States (particularly Washington and Oregon). Thus for Canadians and Northwestern Americans, word pairs like pouter/powder ( versus ) and rider/writer are pronounced differently (though the former pair is less common and/or less pronounced in the Northwestern U.S.)

California

California, the most populated U.S. state, has been documented as having some notable new subsets of Western U.S. English. Some youthful urban Californians possess a vowel shift partly identical to the Canadian shift in its backing or lowering of each front vowel one space in the mouth. Before   may be identified with the phoneme , so rang is pronounced with the same vowel as ray. The pin–pen merger is complete in Bakersfield and rural areas of the Central Valley, and speakers in Sacramento either perceive or produce an approximation of this merger.

Greater New York City 

As in Eastern New England, the accents of New York City, Long Island, and adjoining New Jersey cities are traditionally non-rhotic, while other greater New York area varieties falling under the same sweeping dialect are usually rhotic or variably rhotic. Metropolitan New York shows the back  and  vowels of the North, but a fronted  vowel. Furthermore, the father vowel is traditionally kept distinct from either vowel, resulting in a three "lot-palm-father distinction".

The r-colored vowel of cart is back and often rounded , and not fronted as it famously is in Boston. New York City and its surrounding areas are also known for a complicated short-a split into lax  versus tense , so that words, for example, like cast, calf, and cab have a different, higher, tenser vowel sound than cat, catch, and cap. The New York accent is well attested in American movies and television shows, often exaggerated, particularly in movies and shows about American mobsters from the area. Though it is sometimes known as a "Bronx" or "Brooklyn accent", no research has confirmed differences of accent between the city's boroughs.

Northern and North-Central United States 
One vast super-dialectal area commonly identified by linguists is "the North", usually meaning New England, inland areas of the Mid-Atlantic states, and the North-Central States. There is no cot–caught merger in the North around the Great Lakes and southern New England, although the merger is in progress in the North-bordering Midland and is completed in northern New England, including as far down the Atlantic coast as Boston. The western portions of the North may also show a transitioning or completing cot-caught merger. Indeed, in part of the North (much of Wisconsin and Minnesota),  remains back in all environments. Where the Southeast has  the single word on, the North has .

North 

The traditional and linguistically conservative North (as defined by the Atlas of North American English) includes  being often raised or fronted before , or both, as well as a firm resistance to the cot-caught merger (though possibly weakening in dialects reversing the fronting of ). Maintaining these two features, but also developing several new ones, a younger accent of the North is now predominating at its center, around the Great Lakes and away from the Atlantic coast: the Inland North.

Inland North 

The Inland North is a dialect region once considered the home of "standard Midwestern" speech that was the basis for General American in the mid-20th century. However, the Inland North dialect has been modified in the mid-1900s by the Northern Cities Vowel Shift (NCS), which is now the region's main outstanding feature, though it has been observed to be reversing at least in some areas, in particular with regards to  raising before non-nasal consonants and  fronting. The Inland North is centered on the area on the U.S. side of the Great Lakes, most prominently including central and western New York State (including Syracuse, Binghamton, Rochester, and Buffalo), much of Michigan's Lower Peninsula (Detroit, Grand Rapids), Toledo, Cleveland, Chicago, Gary, and southeastern Wisconsin (Milwaukee, Racine, Kenosha), but broken up by the city of Erie, whose accent today is non-Inland Northern and even Midland-like. The NCS itself is not uniform throughout the Inland North; it is most advanced in Western New York and Michigan, and less developed elsewhere.

New England 
New England does not form a single unified dialect region, but rather houses as few as four native varieties of English, with some linguists identifying even more. Only Southwestern New England (Connecticut and western Massachusetts) neatly fits under the aforementioned definition of "the North". Otherwise, speakers, namely of Eastern New England, show very unusual other qualities. All of New England has a nasal short-a system, meaning that the short-a vowel most strongly raises before nasal consonants, as in much of the rest of the country.

Northeastern New England

The local and historical dialect of the coastal portions of New England, sometimes called Eastern New England English, now only encompasses Northeastern New England: Maine, New Hampshire (some of whose urban speakers are retreating from this local accent), and eastern Massachusetts (including Greater Boston). Most famously, Northern New England accents (with the exception of Northwestern New England, much of southern New Hampshire, and Martha's Vineyard) are often non-rhotic. Many Eastern New England speakers also once had a class of words with "broad a"—that is,  as in father in words that in most accents contain , such as bath, half, and can't, similar to their pronunciation in London and southern England. The  phoneme has highly distinct allophones before nasal consonants.  fronting is usual before .

Rhode Island
Rhode Island, dialectally identified as "Southeastern New England", is sometimes grouped with the Eastern New England dialect region, both by the dialectologists of the mid–20th century and in certain situations by the Atlas of North American English; it shares Eastern New England's traditional non-rhoticity (or "R Dropping"). A key linguistic difference between Rhode Island and the rest of the Eastern New England, however, is that Rhode Island is subject to the father–bother merger and yet neither the cot–caught merger nor  fronting before . Therefore, Rhode Island English aligns in some features more with Boston English and other features more with New York City English.

Western New England
Recognized by research since the 1940s is the linguistic boundary between Eastern and Western New England, the latter settled from the Connecticut and New Haven colonies, rather than the Massachusetts Bay and Plymouth colonies. Western New Englanders settled most of upstate New York and the Inland North. Dialectological research has revealed some phonological nuances separating a Northwestern and Southwestern New England accent. Vermont, sometimes dialectally identified as "Northwestern New England", has the full cot-caught merger and  fronting before  of Boston or Maine English, and yet none of the other marked features of Eastern New England, nor much evidence of the NCS, which is more robustly documented, though still variable, in Southwestern New England. Rhoticity predominates in all of Western New England, as does the father–bother merger of the rest of the nation. Southwestern New England merely forms a "less strong" extension of the Inland North dialect region, and it centers on Connecticut and western Massachusetts. The cot–caught merger is approximated in western Massachusetts but usually still resisted in Connecticut. The "tail" of Connecticut may have some character diffused from New York City English.

North Central 

The North Central or Upper Midwest dialect region of the United States extends from the Upper Peninsula of Michigan westward across northern Minnesota and North Dakota into the middle of Montana. Although the Atlas of North American English does not include the North Central region as part of the North proper, it shares all of the features listed above as properties of the North as a whole. The North Central is a linguistically conservative region; it participates in few of the major ongoing sound changes of North American English. The movie Fargo, which takes place in the North Central region, famously features strong versions of this accent. Unlike most of the rest of the North, the cot–caught merger is prevalent in the North Central region. Like in Canada,   is raised before /g/. In addition, some speakers will show NCS features, like   raising towards  and   fronting towards .

Southeastern United States 

Essentially all of the modern-day Southern dialects, plus dialects marginal to the South (some even in geographically and culturally "Northern" states), are thus considered a subset of this super-region: the whole American South, the southern half of the Mid- and South Atlantic regions, and a transitional Midland dialect area between the South and the North, comprising parts of Oklahoma, Kansas, Missouri, southeastern Nebraska, southern Illinois, southern Indiana, and southern Ohio. 
These are the minimal necessary features that identify a speaker from the Southeastern super-region:
In much of the South during the 1900s, there was a trend to lower the vowel found in words like stalk and caught, often with an upglide, so that the most common result today is the gliding vowel . However, the cot–caught merger is becoming increasingly common throughout the United States, thus affecting Southeastern (even some Southern) dialects, towards a merged vowel . In the South, this merger, or a transition towards this merger, is especially documented in central, northern, and (particularly) western Texas.

Pin–pen merger in transition: The vowels  and  often merge when before nasal consonants, so that pen and pin, for instance, or hem and him, are pronounced the same, as pin or him, respectively. The merger is towards the sound . This merger is now firmly completed throughout the Southern dialect region; however, it is not found in some vestigial varieties of the older South, and other geographically Southern U.S. varieties that have eluded the Southern Vowel Shift, such as the Yat dialect of New Orleans or the anomalous dialect of Savannah, Georgia. The pin–pen merger has also spread beyond the South in recent decades and is now found in isolated parts of the West and the southern Midwest as well.
Rhoticity: Dropping of postvocalic r (and, in some dialects, intervocalic r) was historically widespread in the South, particularly in former plantation areas. This phenomenon, non-rhoticity, was considered prestigious across the nation before World War II, after which the social perception reversed. Rhoticity (sometimes called r-fulness), in which all or most r sounds are pronounced, historically found only in the Midland, Appalachia, and some other Southeastern regions, has now become dominant throughout almost the entire Southeastern super-region, as in most American English, and even more so among younger and female white Southerners; major exceptions are among Black or African American Southerners, whose modern vernacular dialect continues to be mostly non-rhotic as well as most of southern Louisiana, where non-rhotic accents still dominate. The sound quality of the Southeastern r is the distinctive "bunch-tongued r", produced by strongly constricting the root and/or midsection of the tongue.

Midland 

A band of the United States from Pennsylvania west to the Great Plains is what twentieth-century linguists identified as the "Midland" dialect region, though this dialect's same features are now reported in certain other pockets of the country too (for example, some major cities in Texas, all in Central and South Florida, and particular cities that are otherwise Southern). In older and traditional dialectological research, focused on lexicology (vocabulary) rather than phonology (accent), the Midland was divided into two discrete geographical subdivisions: the "North Midland" that begins north of the Ohio River valley area and, south of that, the "South Midland" dialect area. The North Midland region stretches from east-to-west across central and southern Ohio, central Indiana, central Illinois, Iowa, and northern Missouri, as well as Nebraska and Kansas where it begins to blend into the West. The South Midland dialect region follows the Ohio River in a generally southwesterly direction, moving across from Kentucky, southern Indiana, and southern Illinois to southern Missouri, Arkansas, southeastern Kansas, and Oklahoma, west of the Mississippi River. The distinction between a "North" versus "South Midland" was discarded in the 2006 Atlas of North American English, in which the former "North Midland" is now simply called "the Midland" (and argued to have a "stronger claim" to a General American accent than any other region) and the "South Midland" is considered merely as the upper portion of "the South"; this ANAE reevaluation is primarily on the basis of phonology. The Midland is characterized by having a distinctly fronter realization of the  phoneme (as in boat) than many other American accents, particularly those of the North; the phoneme is frequently realized with a central nucleus, approximating . For this reason, one of the names for the North-Midland boundary is the "on line". However, since the twentieth century, this area is currently undergoing a vowel merger of the "short o"  (as in cot) and 'aw'  (as in caught) phonemes, known as the cot-caught merger. Many speakers show transitional forms of the merger. The  phoneme (as in cat) shows most commonly a so-called "continuous" distribution:  is raised and tensed toward  before nasal consonants, as in much of the country.

Midland outside the Midland 
Atlanta, Georgia has been characterized by a massive movement of non-Southerners into the area during the 1990s, leading the city to becoming hugely inconsistent in terms of dialect. Currently,  is variably monophthongized (as in the Southern U.S.); no complete cot-caught merger is reported; and the pin–pen merger is variable.

Charleston, South Carolina is an area where, today, most speakers have clearly conformed to a Midland regional accent, rather than any Southern accent. Charleston was once home to its own very locally-unique accent that encompassed elements of older British English while resisting Southern regional accent trends, perhaps with additional linguistic influence from French Huguenots, Sephardi Jews, and, due to Charleston's high concentration of African-Americans that spoke the Gullah language, Gullah African Americans. The most distinguishing feature of this now-dying accent is the way speakers pronounce the name of the city, to which a standard listener would hear "Chahlston", with a silent "r".

Central and South Florida show no evidence of any type of  glide deletion, Central Florida shows a pin–pen merger, and South Florida does not. Otherwise, Central and South Florida easily fit under the definition of the Midland dialect, including the cot-caught merger being transitional. In South Florida, particularly in and around Miami-Dade, Broward, and Monroe counties, a unique dialect, commonly called the "Miami accent", is widely spoken. The dialect first developed among second- or third-generation Hispanics, including Cuban-Americans, whose first language was English. Unlike the older Florida Cracker dialect, "Miami accent" is rhotic. It also incorporates a rhythm and pronunciation heavily influenced by Spanish (wherein rhythm is syllable-timed).

Mid-Atlantic States 

The cities of the Mid-Atlantic States around the Delaware Valley (South Jersey, southeastern Pennsylvania, northern Delaware, and eastern Maryland) are typically classified together, their speakers most popularly labelled as having a Philadelphia accent or a Baltimore accent. While Labov et al. state that the dialect could potentially be included in the Midland super-region, the dialect is not included in Midland proper as a result of distinct phonological features defining the dialect. The Mid-Atlantic split of  into two separate phonemes, similar to but not exactly the same as New York City English, is one major defining feature of the dialect region, as is a resistance to the Mary–marry–merry merger and cot-caught merger (a raising and diphthongizing of the "caught" vowel), and a maintained distinction between historical short o and long o before intervocalic , so that, for example, orange, Florida, and horrible have a different stressed vowel than story and chorus; all of these features are shared between Mid-Atlantic American and New York City English.

According to linguist Barbara Johnstone, migration patterns and geography affected the Philadelphia dialect's development, which was especially influenced by immigrants from Northern England, Scotland, and Northern Ireland.

South 

The Southern United States is often dialectally identified as "The South," as in ANAE. There is still great variation between sub-regions in the South (see here for more information) and between older and younger generations. Southern American English as Americans popularly imagine began to take its current shape only after the beginning of the twentieth century. The South Midland dialect (now considered the upper portion of the Southern U.S. dialect and often not distinguished phonologically) follows the Ohio River in a generally southwesterly direction, moves across Arkansas and some of Oklahoma west of the Mississippi, and peters out in West Texas; it also includes some of North Florida, namely around Jacksonville. It most noticeably has the loss of the diphthong , which becomes . This particular shift probably does not occur for speakers with the cot–caught merger. The lowering movement of the Southern Vowel Shift is also accompanied by a raising and "drawling" movement of vowels.

Inland South and Texas South

The ANAE identifies two important, especially advanced subsets of the South in terms of their leading the Southern Vowel Shift (detailed above): the "Inland South" located in the southern half of Appalachia and the "Texas South," which only covers the north-central region of Texas (Dallas), Odessa, and Lubbock, but not Abilene, El Paso, or southern Texas (which have more Midland-like accents). One Texan distinction from the rest of the South is that all Texan accents have been reported as showing a pure, non-gliding  vowel, and the identified "Texas South" accent, specifically, is at a transitional stage of the cot-caught merger; the "Inland South" accent of Appalachia, however, firmly resists the merger. Pronunciations of the Southern dialect in Texas may also show notable influence derived from an early Spanish-speaking population or from German immigrants.

Marginal Southeast
The following Southeastern super-regional locations fit cleanly into none of the aforementioned subsets of the Southeast, and may even be marginal-at-best members of the super-region itself:

Many other features of phonological (and lexical) note exist here too; for example, Ocracoke, North Carolina shows no cot–caught merger and its monophthongs are diphthongized (up-gliding) before /ʃ/ and /tʃ/ and Smith Island, Maryland shows an  that is diphthongized (like the South) and no happy tensing.

New Orleans, Louisiana has been home to a type of accent with parallels to the New York City accent reported for over a century. This variety of New Orleans English has been locally nicknamed "Yat" since at least the 1980s, from a traditional greeting "Where y'at" ("Where are you at?", meaning "How are you?"). The stereotypical New York coil–curl merger of "toity-toid street" (33rd Street) used to be a common New Orleans feature as well, though it has mostly receded today. One of the most detailed phonetic depictions of an extreme "yat" accent of the early 20th century is found in the speech of the character Krazy Kat in the comic strip of the same name by George Herriman. Such extreme accents still be found in parts of Mid-City and the 9th ward, Jefferson Parish, as well as in St. Bernard Parish, just east of New Orleans. The novel A Confederacy of Dunces by John Kennedy Toole often employs the Yat accent. 

Oklahoma City, Oklahoma, according to the ANAE's research, is not quite a member of the Midland dialect region. Rather, its features seem to be a blend of the Western and Midland dialects. The overview of ANAE's studied features for Oklahoma City speakers include a conservative , conservative , transitional cot-caught merger, and variable pin–pen merger.

Savannah, Georgia once had a local accent that is now "giving way to regional patterns" of the Midland. According to the ANAE, there is much transition in Savannah, and the following features are reported as inconsistent or highly variable in the city: the Southern phenomenon of  being monophthongized, non-rhoticity,  fronting, the cot–caught merger, the pin–pen merger, and conservative  (which is otherwise rarely if ever reported in either the South or the Midland).

St. Louis, Missouri is historically one among several (North) Midland cities, but it is largely considered by ANAE to classify under blends of Inland North accents, with the Northern Cities Vowel Shift (NCS), and Midland accents. The "St. Louis Corridor" demonstrates this variability in speakers following a line formed by U.S. Route 66 in Illinois (now Interstate 55), going from Chicago southwest to St. Louis. This corridor of speakers cuts right through the center of what is otherwise the firmly-documented Midland region. Older St. Louisans demonstrate a card-cord merger, so that "I-44" is pronounced like "I farty-four". St. Louis resists the cot–caught merger and middle-aged speakers show the most advanced stages of the NCS, while maintaining many of the other Midland features.

Western Pennsylvania 

The chief distinguishing feature of Western Pennsylvania as a whole is that the cot–caught merger is noticeably complete here, whereas it is still in progress in most of the Midland. The merger has also spread from Western Pennsylvania into adjacent West Virginia, historically in the South Midland dialect region. This is the source of the stereotypical Pittsburgh pronunciation of downtown as "dahntahn".

See also
Accent (sociolinguistics)
American English
Boontling
California English
Canadian English
Chicano English
English in New Mexico
Hawaiian Pidgin
Pacific Northwest English

References

Notes

Citations

Bibliography 

 

 
 
 
 
 "Utahnics", segment on All Things Considered, National Public Radio February 16, 1997.

External links
Stanford.edu: Penny Eckert Blog − "Vowel Shifts in Northern California and the Detroit Suburbs"
Voicesus.com: Directory of 129 North American English accents

English phonology
American English
Canadian English
English language in Canada